The Constitutional Council of Chad judges the constitutionality of legislation and treaties in Chad. It consists of nine judges who are elected to 9-year terms. It is established by Title VII of the Constitution of Chad.

References

Sources
Background Notes on Chad from the United States Department of State

Law of Chad
Chad
Chad